Bokermannohyla langei is a species of frog in the family Hylidae.
It is endemic to Brazil, known only from Paraná. It is known from three specimens collected in 1953 and searches since 1986 have not found this frog.
Its natural habitats are subtropical or tropical moist lowland forests, rivers, freshwater marshes, and intermittent freshwater marshes. It may be threatened by touristic activities but is protected by Parque Estadual Pico do Marumbi.

References

Sources
 

Bokermannohyla
Endemic fauna of Brazil
Amphibians described in 1965
Taxonomy articles created by Polbot